Cover is the fourth solo album by Tom Verlaine. It was released in 1984.

Track listing
All songs written and composed by Tom Verlaine; except "Five Miles of You" composed with Jimmy Ripp 
"Five Miles of You" (4:20)
"Travelling" (5:00)
"O Foolish Heart" (4:28)
"Lindi-Lu" (3:40)
"Let Go the Mansion" (3:08)
"Dissolve/Reveal" (4:41)
"Miss Emily" (4:41)
"Rotation" (4:11)
"Swim" (4:31)

Personnel
Tom Verlaine - guitars, solos, vocals, synthesizer; drum machine on "O Foolish Heart", "Let Go the Mansion", "Dissolve/Reveal" and "Swim"
Jimmy Ripp - guitars, bass on "Swim"
Fred Smith -  bass
Bill Laswell - bass on "Miss Emily"
Jay Dee Daugherty - drums on "Five Miles of You" and "Travelling"
Allan Schwartzberg - drums on "Lindi-Lu", "Miss Emily" and "Rotation"
Technical
Ray Niznik, Michael Ewasko, Dave Jerden, Mario Salvati, Howard Gray, Steve Brown - engineers
Jill Furmanovsky - photography

Charts

Reception 
NME ranked it number 18 among the "Albums of the Year" for 1984.

References 

1984 albums
Tom Verlaine albums
Virgin Records albums